The Ave Maria (Hail Mary) is a traditional Christian prayer addressing Mary, mother of Jesus.

Ave Maria may also refer to:

Films
Ave Maria (1918 film), a British silent film directed by Wilfred Noy
Ave Maria (1920 film), a 1920 Italian silent film directed by Memmo Genua and Diana Karenne
Ave Maria (1936 film), a 1936 German and Italian film directed by Johannes Riemann
Ave Maria (1953 film), a West German drama film directed by Alfred Braun
Ave Maria (1984 film), a 1984 French drama film directed by Jacques Richard
Avé Maria (2006), a Portuguese TV movie starring Beatriz Batarda
 Ave Maria (2015 film), directed by Basil Khalil
Ave Maryam, a 2019 Indonesian romance drama film

Music

Albums 
Ave Maria (album), a 2021 album by Maria Peszek
Ave Maria, a 1980 album by Plácido Domingo
Ave Maria, a 1992 album by Stephanie Salas
Ave Maria – En Plein Air, a 2015 album by Finnish singer Tarja Turunen

Compositions

"Ave Maria ... Virgo serena", a 15th-century motet by Josquin des Prez
"Ave Maria" (Schubert) or "Ellens dritter Gesang" (1825), a composition by Franz Schubert
Ave Maria, WAB 5, a choral setting by Bruckner (1856)
"Ave Maria", a choral setting by Johannes Brahms (1858)
"Ave Maria" (Bach/Gounod) (1859), an aria by Charles Gounod, based on a piece by Johann Sebastian Bach
Ave Maria (Bruckner), motet by Anton Bruckner (1861)
Ave Maria, WAB 7, a choral setting by Bruckner (1882)
"Ave Maria", an aria by Giuseppe Verdi, from Otello (1887)
"Ave Maria" (Verdi), a setting for four voices a cappella (1889)
"Ave Maria" (Intermezzo), an aria by Pietro Mascagni from Cavalleria rusticana (1890)
Ave Maria (Stravinsky), motet by Igor Stravinsky (1934)
"Ave Maria", a choral setting by Franz Biebl (before 1959)
"Ave Maria" (Vavilov) (1970), an aria by Vladimir Vavilov, falsely ascribed to Giulio Caccini
"Ave Maria", a choral setting by Morten Lauridsen (1997)
"Ave Maria", a short composition for soprano and orchestra by Stefano Lentini published on the album Stabat Mater (2013)

Songs
"Ave Maria", a song by Mac Miller from his album Faces
"Ave Maria" (Beyoncé song), 2008
"Ave Maria", a song by French singer Charles Aznavour
"Ave María", a song by Spanish singer David Bisbal from his album Corazón latino
"Ave Maria", a song by Rowland S. Howard from his album Pop Crimes
"Ave Maria (Survivors of a Different Kind)", a song by Jennifer Rush
"Ave Mary A", a song by Pink from her album Funhouse
"Maria (Ave Maria)," originally released in 1972 as a solo single by Korean vocalist Djong Yun, later included as a bonus track on the re-release of Popol Vuh's album Hosianna Mantra.

Places
Ave Maria, Florida, a planned college town near Naples, Florida, U.S.
Ave María, Málaga, a ward of Carretera de Cádiz district, Málaga, Spain
Ave Maria Grotto, a landscaped park in Cullman, Alabama
Ave Maria Lane, a street near St Paul's Cathedral, London, England

Brands and enterprises
Ave Maria Mutual Funds, U.S. mutual fund family
Ave Maria Press, a Catholic book publisher
Ave Maria Radio, radio operator

Education
Ave Maria College, Melbourne, a Catholic secondary college for girls in Melbourne, Victoria, Australia
Ave Maria School of Law, a Roman Catholic law school in Naples, Florida
Ave Maria University, Roman Catholic university in southwest Florida
Ave Maria University-Latin American Campus, branch campus of Ave Maria University, located in Nicaragua

See also
Hail Mary (disambiguation)
Maria (disambiguation)